Seeds in the Heart: Japanese Literature from Earliest Times to the Late Sixteenth Century is the first book (though the last to be written and published) in Donald Keene's four-book series A History of Japanese Literature. It is followed by World Within Walls: Japanese Literature of the Pre-Modern Era, 1600–1867, Dawn to the West: Japanese Literature of the Modern Era; Fiction, and the last book in the series, Dawn to the West: Japanese Literature in the Modern Era; Poetry, Drama, Criticism. It covers classical prose works such as the Kojiki  and the Tale of Genji  and major waka poets like Fujiwara no Teika or Ki no Tsurayuki, through the Kamakura period and up to the beginnings of Noh plays and renga, in 1175 pages of text and endnotes (excluding the bibliography, index, and glossary).

References

Seeds in the Heart: Japanese Literature from Earliest Times to the Late Sixteenth Century, Donald Keene. 1999, Columbia University Press, 

Japanese literature
1993 non-fiction books
Henry Holt and Company books